Charlotte Gentry Burks (born October 3, 1942) is a farmer and Democratic party politician in Tennessee who represented the 15th district as State Senator from 1998 until 2015.

Burks was born in 1942 in Gainesboro, Tennessee, and lives in Monterey, Tennessee. She was married to Tommy Burks, a Tennessee State Senator. They had three children together, one of whom is former Putnam County Executive Kim Blaylock. She also has 11 grandchildren.

Career 
In 1998, after Burks' husband was assassinated during an election campaign by his Republican challenger Byron (Low-Tax) Looper, she became a write-in candidate for his seat. Although she did not campaign, family members and friends campaigned extensively on her behalf, and she defeated Looper by a landslide margin, receiving 95% of the vote and becoming the first write-in candidate to win a seat in the Tennessee State Senate. She began her Senate service with the 101st General Assembly.

Burks was reelected in 2002 and 2006 with no substantive opposition. In 2010, when Republicans picked up many seats in the General Assembly, Burks won re-election to a fourth four-year term by a margin of just 183 votes over her Republican opponent, Gary Steakley. Burks carried five of the six counties in the largely rural district, losing only in Cumberland County. An independent candidate placed third in the vote. Steakley challenged the results, claiming irregularities on election day, but a State Senate committee found that there was insufficient evidence to question the outcome.

In the Senate, Burks served as the secretary of the education committee; as a member of the joint study economic development; government operations; select on children and youth; and the environment, conservation, and tourism committees. On September 8, 2013 she announced her retirement and that she would not run for reelection to the State Senate in 2014. On Election Day, the Republican candidate won the seat.

References

External links
Senator Charlotte Burks - District 15 official State Senate website
Senator Charlotte Burks official campaign website
Project Vote Smart - Charlotte Burks (TN) profile
Follow the Money - Charlotte Burks
2008 2006 2004 2002 1998 campaign contributions
Official website of the town of Gainesboro, Tennessee

1942 births
Living people
People from Gainesboro, Tennessee
Democratic Party Tennessee state senators
People from Putnam County, Tennessee
Women state legislators in Tennessee
21st-century American women